Risiera di San Sabba is a five-storey brick-built compound located in Trieste, northern Italy, that functioned during World War II as a Nazi concentration camp for the detention and killing of political prisoners, and a transit camp for Jews, most of whom were then deported to Auschwitz. SS members Odilo Globočnik and Karl Frenzel, and Ivan Marchenko are all said to have participated in the killings at this camp. The cremation facilities, the only ones built inside a concentration camp in Italy, were installed by Erwin Lambert, and were destroyed before the camp was liberated. Today, the former concentration camp operates as a civic museum.

Background
The building was erected in 1913 and first used as a rice-husking facility (hence the name Risiera).  During World War II, German occupation forces in Trieste used the building to transport, detain and exterminate prisoners.  Many occupants of Risiera di San Sabba were transported to the German Nazi concentration camp at Auschwitz-Birkenau in Occupied Poland.  Historians estimate that over 3,000 people were killed at the Risiera camp and thousands more imprisoned and transported elsewhere. The majority of prisoners came from Friuli, the Julian March and the Province of Ljubljana.

Boris Pahor was also held at the camp before being transported to the concentration camps of Dachau and Natzweiler-Struthof.

After the war, the camp served as a refugee camp and transit point in the 1950s, where many people, especially ethnic Italians fled Socialist Federal Republic of Yugoslavia.

See also
 Bullenhuser Damm
 Operational Zone of the Adriatic Littoral

References

External links
 Risiera di San Sabba Official website 
 Risiera di San Sabba Museum (in Italian) with link to a downloadable English PDF file
 27 gennaio 2010 "Giorno della Memoria" a Trieste presso la Scuola Agenti di Polizia, Carcere Coroneo e Risiera di San Sabba

1913 establishments in Austria-Hungary
Buildings and structures in Trieste
Industrial buildings completed in 1913
Museums in Friuli-Venezia Giulia
Nazi concentration camps in Italy
World War II museums in Italy
History of Trieste